Ctenophorus is a genus of lizards, commonly known as comb-bearing dragons, in the family Agamidae. The genus contains the most diverse group of dragon lizards in Australia. It is the largest group of Australian lizards and it has an extensive radiation in the arid zones. Many of the species of Ctenophorus have been grouped by a similar morphology. The informal names and groupings within this genus — rock dragon, crevice-dragon, ground-dragon, sand-dragon, and bicycle-dragon — are named after the mythological creature, the dragon.

Lizards in the genus Ctenophorus may be confused with lizards in the genera Tympanocryptis and Diporiphora.

Species
There are 34 recognized species in the genus.
Ctenophorus adelaidensis (Gray, 1841) – western heath dragon
Ctenophorus butlerorum (Storr, 1977) – Butler's dragon, Shark Bay heath dragon, Edel heath dragon
Ctenophorus caudicinctus (Günther, 1875) – ring-tailed bicycle-dragon, ring-tailed dragon
Ctenophorus chapmani (Storr, 1977) – Chapman's dragon, southern heath dragon, Bight heath dragon
Ctenophorus clayi (Storr, 1967) – black-shouldered ground-dragon, black-collared dragon
Ctenophorus cristatus (Gray 1841) –  crested bicycle-dragon, crested dragon, bicycle dragon
Ctenophorus decresii (A.M.C. Duméril & Bibron, 1837) – tawny crevice-dragon, tawny dragon
Ctenophorus femoralis (Storr, 1965) – long-tailed sand-dragon
Ctenophorus fionni (Procter, 1923) – Peninsula crevice-dragon, Peninsula dragon
Ctenophorus fordi (Storr, 1965) – Mallee dragon, Mallee sand-dragon, Mallee military dragon
Ctenophorus gibba (Houston, 1974) –  Bulldust ground-dragon, gibber dragon
Ctenophorus graafi (Storr, 1967) – Graaf's dragon
Ctenophorus infans (Storr, 1967) – Laverton ring-tailed dragon
Ctenophorus isolepis (Fischer, 1881) – central military dragon
Ctenophorus maculatus (Gray, 1831) – spotted military dragon, spotted dragon, spotted sand-dragon
Ctenophorus maculosus (F.J. Mitchell, 1948) – Lake Eyre dragon, salt-lake ground-dragon
Ctenophorus mckenziei (Storr, 1981) – dwarf bicycle-dragon, McKenzie's dragon
Ctenophorus mirrityana (McLean et al., 2013) – Barrier Range dragon
Ctenophorus modestus (Ahl, 1926)
Ctenophorus nguyarna Doughty, Maryan, Melville & J. Austin, 2007 – Lake Disappointment dragon
Ctenophorus nuchalis (De Vis, 1884) – central netted dragon, central netted ground-dragon
Ctenophorus ornatus (Gray, 1845) – ornate dragon, ornate crevice-dragon
Ctenophorus parviceps (Storr, 1964) – Gnaraloo heath dragon, northwestern heath dragon
Ctenophorus pictus (W. Peters, 1866) – painted dragon
Ctenophorus reticulatus (Gray, 1845) – western netted dragon, western netted ground-dragon
Ctenophorus rubens  – reddening sand-dragon, rufus sand dragon
Ctenophorus rufescens (Stirling & Zietz, 1893) – rusty crevice-dragon, rusty dragon
Ctenophorus salinarum (Storr, 1966) – saltpan ground-dragon, claypan dragon
Ctenophorus scutulatus (Stirling & Zietz, 1893) – lozenge-marked dragon, lozenge-marked bicycle-dragon
Ctenophorus slateri (Storr, 1967) – Slater's dragon
Ctenophorus spinodomus Sadlier, Colgan, Beatson & Cogger, 2019 – Eastern Mallee dragon
Ctenophorus tjantjalka Johnston, 1992 – ochre dragon
Ctenophorus vadnappa (Houston, 1974) – red-barred crevice-dragon, red-barred dragon
Ctenophorus yinnietharra (Storr, 1981) – Yinnietharra crevice-dragon, Yinnietharra rock dragon

Polymorphism
Lizards of the genus Ctenophorus are known to display color polymorphism, more than one color type being found within a population. It is believed that color polymorphism in this group has evolved as a result of a combination of sexual selection and natural selection.

References

External links
List of links to a page about each species, some with images
Google search for images
https://www.samuseum.sa.gov.au/Upload/Files-Biological-Sciences/R-and-A-text/Key-to-the-Dragons-of-South-Australia_1.pdf

Further reading
Fitzinger L (1843). Systema Reptilium, Fasciculus Primus, Amblyglossae. Vienna: Braumüller & Seidel. 106 pp. + indices. (Ctenophorus, new genus, p. 83). (in Latin).
Wilson S, Swan G (2003). A Complete Guide to Reptiles of Australia. Second edition. Sydney: New Holland Publishing.

 
Agamid lizards of Australia
Lizard genera
Taxa named by Leopold Fitzinger